USS John Rodgers (DD-983), a , was the sixth ship of the United States Navy to be named for the three generations of the Rodgers family who served in the navy.

John Rodgers was laid down on 12 August 1976 by Ingalls Shipbuilding, Pascagoula, Mississippi. The vessel was launched on 18 March 1978, sponsored by Mrs. Roy C. Smith, Jr., the great, great-granddaughter of Commodore John Rodgers, and commissioned on 14 July 1979.

Operational history
During the early 1980s, John Rodgers sailed into the Atlantic, Pacific, and Indian Oceans under her commanding officer, Commander Wagner. She traversed both the Panama Canal and the Suez Canal. Under U.S. policy, John Rodgers sailed into the Persian Gulf in support of Iraq, during Iraq's war against Iran.

John Rodgers crossed the equator on the way to Kenya. This resulted in the initiation of the "Pollywogs" (those who have not crossed the equator) by the "Shellbacks" (those who have crossed the equator). During this period, John Rodgers made port calls on four continents, including Panama, Spain, Italy, France, Monaco, England, Germany, Finland, Denmark, Morocco, Egypt, Israel, Bahrain and Kenya.

On September 16, 1983 while operating off Lebanon, John Rodgers fired her 5" guns against Syrian controlled portions of Lebanon in response to Syrian shelling near the residence of the U.S. ambassador and harassing fire upon the U.S. Marines stationed at the Beirut airport.  This made her the very first ship to use the 5" 54 caliber Mark 45 gun in actual combat. This gun is now the standard large caliber gun system on U.S. naval combat ships and the many of many other nations around the world.

On 19 September, U.S. policy shift from presence to direct support of Lebanese Army forces defending the strategically important village of Suk El Gharb in the Chouf Mountains east of Beirut. Ongoing fire support missions continued through 21 September.

During deployment in the Mediterranean Sea in 1990, the USS John Rodgers was sitting off of the coast of Israel when Iraq invaded Kuwait. The John Rodgers immediately began operations in support of Operation Desert Shield. For a couple of weeks, the John Rodgers performed patrols in the Mediterranean Sea. Prior to completing their deployment, the John Rodgers took up position in the Red Sea, continuing patrols.

In 1993, John Rodgers departed as the flagship for Commander, South Atlantic Force during UNITAS XXXIV under Rear Admiral. (lower half) Wirt R. Fladd, USN. During these several months of her long deployment, she cooperated with the navies of various South American nations, while making a number of goodwill port calls. Additionally, she traversed the Panama Canal and crossed the Equator on the way to South America. This resulted in the initiation of the "Pollywogs" (those who have not crossed the equator) by the "Shellbacks" (those who have crossed the equator). Lastly, she traversed the inland waterway from West to East at the tip of South American before continuing the cruise up the East coast of the continent. Stops during this cruise included Caracas, Venezuela; Cartagena, Colombia; Lima, Peru; Valparaiso, Chile; Buenos Aires, Argentina; Montevideo, Uruguay; Rio de Janeiro and Fortaleza, Brazil.

In 1995 she deployed as part of the NATO Standing Naval Force Atlantic.  Because of active hostilities among the countries formed following the breakup of the Former Republic of Yugoslavia, she spent much of this deployment engaged in Maritime Interdiction Operations in the Adriatic Sea in support of Operation Sharp Guard. Her crew was able to enjoy some ports of call during the six-month cruise, including Lisbon, Portugal; Palma de Mallorca, Spain; Marseille, France; Naples and Trieste, Italy; Corfu, Greece; and Istanbul, Turkey.

Owing to the closure of the Naval Station Charleston by the BRAC Commission in 1995, John Rodgers transferred her homeport from Charleston, South Carolina to Mayport, Florida in August of that year. Mayport remained her homeport throughout the remainder of her service.

From January to March 1996, John Rodgers participated in joint exercises with the British Royal Navy and Royal Marines in the waters around Scotland.  During this time she also made port visits to Edinburgh, Scotland; Bremerhaven, Germany; and Amsterdam, Netherlands.

Also, on 23 May 1996, USS John Rodgers (DD 983) takes place in New York city fleet week.

As a part of this deployment, John Rodgers participated in the Bright Star 97 naval exercise hosted by the Egyptian navy. She also participated in the Reliant Mermaid exercise conducted with Israel and Turkey in January 1998. John Rodgers participated in five other major exercises on this deployment. Port visits on this deployment included Spain, France, Italy, Egypt, Israel, Greece and Turkey.

John Rodgers made eight major deployments, including extensive operations in the Mediterranean Sea, Black Sea, and the Persian Gulf. She also took part in numerous counter drug operations in the Caribbean Sea. She and her crew participated in Operations Shield, Support Democracy, and Sharp Guard.

At various times during her career, John Rodgers served as the flagship for COMDESRONs 14, 20, 22, 32, 36, Canadian COMDESRON ONE, COMSOLANT, COMSTANAVFORLANT, and WEAUCONMARFOR, and also served as the host ship for the Change of Command of COMSIXTHFLT in 1988 and COMSTANAVFORLANT in 1995.

John Rodgers unit awards include: Joint Meritorious Unit Award, Navy Unit Commendation, Meritorious Unit Commendation (second award), Battle "E", National Defense Service Medal, Southwest Asia Service Medal (second award), Humanitarian Service Medal, Sea Service Deployment Ribbon (eighth award), Armed Forces Service Medal and United States Coast Guard Special Operations Service Ribbon.

Fate
John Rodgers was decommissioned and stricken on 4 September 1998; she was stored at NISMF Philadelphia, Pennsylvania, awaiting sale for scrap. By 2005 she had been sold to International Shipbreaking Limited of Brownsville, Texas although scrapping work had yet to be completed. On 29 December 2005, John Rodgers (DD-983) was spotted heading south along the east coast of south Florida under tow.  She has since been broken up for scrap.

Coat of arms

Shield
The shield of John Rodgers symbolizes the service of three generations of the Rodgers family. The anchor represents the service of Commodore John Rodgers, who acted as president of the Board of Naval Commissioners, following the War of 1812, serving until 1837. The compass rose is symbolic of the service of his son, Rear Admiral John Rodgers, who led exploring expeditions in waters off China and through the Bering Strait in 1855. The wings on the crest refer to the service of Commander John Rodgers II who was a pioneer of naval aviation, and the great-grandson of Commodore Rodgers.

Crest
The sea eagle, a sharp-eyed, marine bird-of-prey, represents the ship's primary mission of detection and tracking, with the addition of incredibly deadly striking ability. The three arrowheads refer to the multi-mission capabilities of the destroyer, as well as the naval service of the father, son, and great-grandson for whom the ship is named.

Motto
Sea Eagle Triumphant

Gallery

References

External links 

navsource.org: USS John Rodgers
united-states-navy.com: USS John Rodgers

 

Spruance-class destroyers
Cold War destroyers of the United States
1978 ships